Same-sex marriage in Gibraltar has been legal since 15 December 2016. A bill for the legalisation of same-sex marriages was approved by the Parliament on 26 October 2016 and received royal assent on 1 November 2016. Gibraltar has also allowed civil partnerships since 28 March 2014.

Civil partnerships

In January 2014, a civil partnership bill was published for community consultation and headed for introduction in the Gibraltar Parliament. On 21 March, the bill was approved by Parliament with no noticeable opposition. It was given royal assent on 25 March by Governor James Dutton, officially becoming the Civil Partnership Act 2014. The law and related rules and regulations took effect on 28 March. The law also allows adoption by civil partners, as mandated by a court ruling in 2013.

Civil partnerships offer the same rights and benefits as marriage in terms of inheritance tax, property rights, social security, pension benefits, next of kin rights in hospitals, adoption rights, and others.

Same-sex marriage

The GSLP–Liberal Alliance, re-elected in 2015, included the following commitment in their election manifesto: "We will now publish a Command Paper in order to take the views of the public on how to best deal with the request by some for civil marriage to be extended to same sex couples. We are totally committed both to ensuring that religious denominations are not forced to change their practices, beliefs or sacraments in any way and to the principle that the State must not discriminate between individuals based on the grounds of sexual orientation. The results of the responses to the Command Paper will be published by June [2016]." The Equality Rights Group said it did not go far enough and asked for more commitment to introduce same-sex marriage. On 22 December 2015, a command paper on introducing same-sex marriage was published and was under public consultation until 15 January 2016. On 4 January 2016, it was announced that the consultation period had been extended to 29 January 2016. On 5 January, a government spokesman said that a referendum on the issue would not be ruled out until all the comments submitted by the public had been considered.

On 18 January 2016, in his New Year's message, Daniel Feetham, leader of the Social Democrats, declared his support for same-sex marriage and, despite allowing members of his party a free vote on matters of conscience, said that his parliamentary colleagues all declared their support for the issue as well. He said that it was up to the Government of Gibraltar to decide on how to proceed with the issue when the time comes. On 20 January 2016, Chief Minister Fabian Picardo announced that there would be no referendum on same-sex marriage after a parliamentary debate on the issue was initiated by the opposition Social Democrats. In that same debate, the Chief Minister said that he expected the feedback from the consultation process to improve the same-sex marriage bill.

On 21 March 2016, the government announced that it had received 3,490 responses in regards to the public consultation and that, due to the controversial nature of the subject, it would establish an Inter-Ministerial Committee (composed of four government ministers: Gilbert Licudi, Samantha Sacramento, Neil Costa, and Albert Isola) to listen to the views of the various groups and many of the individuals who expressed a view on the subject, and report its findings back to the cabinet by June 2016. In response to the announcement, the chairman of the Equality Rights Group (ERG), Felix Alvarez, questioned the commitment of the governing GSLP-Liberal Alliance to legislate on the matter and urged both "the LGBT community at large and their friends and supporters to remain calm and reserve their responses until the government comes up with a definitive answer on how to handle this situation". Based on their own statistics and past advocacy efforts, ERG claimed that over 63% of those consultation responses were in favor of same-sex marriage and that the situation should not be made more complicated than it should be.

A government bill on the legalisation of same-sex marriage was published on 15 August 2016. On 26 October 2016, the Civil Marriage Amendment Act 2016 was passed in the Gibraltar Parliament with unanimous support from all 15 members present during the vote. An amendment to remove a controversial part of the bill which allowed deputy registrars to opt out of conducting same-sex marriages was defeated 11 to 4 with only some of the Opposition MPs voting in favor. The bill required that, in circumstances where a deputy registrar did not agree to officiate a same-sex marriage, an alternative registrar had to be assigned to conduct the marriage. The bill received royal assent from Deputy Governor Nick Pyle, acting for Governor Ed Davis, on 1 November and took effect on 15 December 2016. The first same-sex marriage in Gibraltar was performed the following day at the Registry Office between Aaron Mills and Adrian Charles Triay-Dignam.

In May 2017, a same-sex couple seeking to convert their civil partnership into a marriage were told to divorce first by authorities, who cited a lack of legislation for converting a civil partnership to a marriage. This occurred despite the Equality Rights Group confirming that such a provision existed in the law, and that the matter was simply one of excessive paperwork.

The law was officially amended in late 2019 so that deputy registrars are no longer able to opt-out of performing civil same-sex marriages. The amendment was assented by Governor Ed Davis and gazetted shortly thereafter.

Statistics
By October 2017, 39 same-sex marriages had taken place in Gibraltar, with 32 of these being between couples from overseas; 25 between two men and 7 between two women.

Religious performance
The Methodist Church of Great Britain has allowed its ministers to conduct same-sex marriages since 2021. The Methodist Conference voted 254 to 46 in favour of the move. A freedom of conscience clause allows ministers with objections to opt out of performing same-sex weddings. Reverend Fidel Patron of the Gibraltar Methodist Church responded that the church was "not in a position to answer yet" as to whether the church would perform same-sex weddings.

See also
 Lesbianism in Gibraltar
 LGBT rights in Gibraltar
 Recognition of same-sex unions in the British Overseas Territories
 Recognition of same-sex unions in Europe
 Same-sex marriage in the United Kingdom

References

LGBT rights in Gibraltar
Gibraltar
2016 in LGBT history
Same-sex marriage in Europe